Chamillitary is an entertainment company and hip hop record label owned and run by rapper Chamillionaire. It was previously distributed by Universal. It has since been an independent record label company.

History 

Chamillitary Entertainment was founded in 2004 by Chamillionaire after he had left record labels; Swishahouse and Paid In Full Entertainment.

Chamillionaire, alongside The Color Changin' Click, found themselves without a label home- after a falling out with Paul Wall, who returned to Swishahouse. In early 2004, Chamillionaire decided to form his own label; Chamillitary Entertainment. He signed his younger brother Rasaq to the label, as well as 50/50 Twin.

Rasaq would eventually leave the label to pursue his own goals and 50/50 Twin left the label in 2006. Chamillionaire later signed Lil Ken to the label in 2007 along with R&B singer Tony Henry and Yung Ro. Yung Ro would eventually leave the label in late 2008 due to differences with Chamillionaire. The label has been independent since January 15, 2011. This is because Chamillionaire and Universal parted ways. Chamillionaire is currently working on his 3rd studio album Poison.  While working on Poison, Chamillionaire has gone on to release various projects and singles.

Artists

Former artists

Discography

Albums

2005: The Sound of Revenge by Chamillionaire
2007: Ultimate Victory by Chamillionaire
TBA: Poison by Chamillionaire
2012: The Soul Experience by Tony Henry

Extended plays

2012: Ammunition (EP) by Chamillionaire
2013: Elevate by Chamillionaire
2013: Reignfall by Chamillionaire
2015: Nawfwest God EP by Lil Ken

Compilation albums

2005: Chamillitary

Mixtapes

 Rasaq & Chamillionaire
2004: Bootlegger's Special 1.5
2004: Ghetto Status
 The Color Changin' Click
2004: The Mixtape Messiah (Disk 3)
2005: Tippin Down 2005
 Lil Ken
2007: The Undisputed
2008: Money Power & Fame
2011: Chamillitary Presents Famous as... Hollywood Jackson
2013: Hollywood Chronicles
2013: Hollywood Chronicles Vol. 2
2014: Underground Giant Pt. 2
 Tony Henry
2009: Jam Sessions
 Chamillionaire
2004: The Mixtape Messiah
2005: The Truth
2005: Man on Fire
2005: Big Business (With Stat Quo)
2006: Mixtape Messiah 2
2007: Mixtape Messiah 3
2008: Mixtape Messiah 4
2008: Mixtape Messiah 5
2009: Mixtape Messiah 6
2009: Mixtape Messiah 7
2009: I Am Legend: Greatest Verses
2009: Hangin' Wit' Mr. Koopa
2010: Major Pain
2011: Major Pain 1.5
2012: Badazz Freemixes
2012: Badazz Freemixes 2
2012: Badazz Slow-Mixes
2014: Greatest Verses Vol. 2

References 

American record labels
2004 establishments in Texas
Record labels established in 2004
Hip hop record labels